Andrea Myrander (born 1985, Haninge, Sweden) is a Swedish pop singer and former beauty pageant contestant. She was the lead singer of the Eurodance-hip hop group Basic Element from 2007 to early 2011. Myrander has done photoshoots for the men's publication, Moore Magazine. Myrander has also released a single under the stage name Bliz.

Pageants
Myrander won Miss Polonia of Sweden 2007, a beauty pageant, and went on to compete in Miss Polonia, placing in the top ten. She was crowned Miss Haninge 2008 and participated in the Swedish national final for Miss World 2008 but did not win. She competed in Miss Universe Sweden 2010 and placed third to winner Michaela Savic.

References

Swedish beauty pageant winners
1985 births
Living people
21st-century Swedish singers
21st-century Swedish women singers
English-language singers from Sweden